Jasmina Pišek (born 24 May 1996) is a Slovenian handball player for ŽRK Celje and the Slovenian national team.

She participated at the 2018 European Women's Handball Championship.

References

External links

1996 births
Living people
Sportspeople from Celje
Slovenian female handball players